Rahinge is a village in Tähtvere Parish, Tartu County, Estonia. Rahinge has a population of 352 (as of 31 December 2010).

Rahinge was first mentioned in 1582 and has borne the names of Rahinik, Rahhingo and Rahingu.

Poet Karl Eduard Sööt (1862–1950) spent his childhood in Rahinge.

Gallery

References

External links

Rahinge village society 

Villages in Tartu County